Arman Manaryan (December 15, 1929 – February 16, 2016) was an Iranian-born Armenian film director. He was the brother of actor Yervand Manaryan. He repatriated to Soviet Armenia in 1946 and graduated from the Yerevan State Conservatory in 1952 and from the Moscow Institute of Cinematography in 1962. Since then he worked with Armenfilm. He died in 2016, aged 86.

Films
Tjvjik (1962)
Morgan's Relative (1970)

References

1929 births
People from Arak, Iran
Armenian film directors
2016 deaths
Iranian people of Armenian descent
Place of birth missing
Komitas State Conservatory of Yerevan alumni
Gerasimov Institute of Cinematography alumni
Iranian emigrants to the Soviet Union